Man Jhala Bajind is a Marathi Romance Drama television serial which is telecasted on Zee Marathi channel. It is directed by Aniket Sane and written by Tejpal Wagh. It stars Shweta Kharat and Vaibhav Chavan in lead roles. The serial is produced by Tejpal Wagh and Saroj Wagh under the banner of Waghoba Productions. It premiered from 23 August 2021 by replacing Karbhari Laybhari.

Plot 
The story revolves around the love story of a couple called Raya and Krishna.

Special episode

2 hours 
 17 October 2021 (Raya-Krishna's marriage)

1 hour 
 21 November 2021
 19 December 2021
 2 January 2022
 20 February 2022
 6 March 2022
 10 April 2022

Cast

Main 
 Vaibhav Chavan as Rayban (Raya) Bhausaheb Vidhate
 Shweta Kharat as Krishna Govind Phule / Krishna Rayban Vidhate

Recurring 
Raya's family
 Riyaz Mulani as Hritik
 Kalyani Chaudhari as Guli Mavshi
 Sanika Kashikar as Antara Pradeep Borate 
 Vaishali Raje-Ghatge as Ranjana Bhausaheb Vidhate
 Rajesh Aher as Bhausaheb Vidhate
 Vikas Hande as Dadasaheb Vidhate
 Kalpana Sarang as Phui Aaji

Others
 Arbaj Shaikh as Papya
 Tanaji Galgunde as Manoj (Munjya)
 Gajanan Kambale replaced Tanaji as Manoj (Munjya)
 Beena Kalekar as Asha Sopan Raut
 Bharat (Balasaheb) Shinde as Sopan Raut
 Yogesh Deshpande as Vishwajeet Dharmadhikari
 Surendra Sathe as Pradeep Borate
 Suvarna Chothe as Sarika Pradeep Borate
 Bhakti Zanzane as Munjya's mother
 Ankita Narvanekar as Gauri
 Sachin Hagvane-Patil as Madan
 Dhananjay Jamdar as office worker
 Nilima Kamane as Minty's mother
 Rajbhushan Sahastrabuddhe as Astrologer

References

External links 
 
 Man Jhala Bajind at ZEE5

Marathi-language television shows
Zee Marathi original programming
2021 Indian television series debuts
2022 Indian television series endings